Chondrocalcinosis or cartilage calcification is calcification (accumulation of calcium salts) in hyaline cartilage and/or fibrocartilage. It can be seen on radiography.

Causes
Buildup of calcium phosphate in the ankle joints has been found in about 50% of the general population, and may be associated with osteoarthritis.

Another common cause of chondrocalcinosis is calcium pyrophosphate dihydrate crystal deposition disease (CPPD). CPPD is estimated to affect 4% to 7% of the adult populations of Europe and the United States. Previous studies have overestimated the prevalence by simply estimating the prevalence of chondrocalcinosis regardless of cause.

A magnesium deficiency may cause chondrocalcinosis, and there is anecdotal evidence that magnesium supplementation may reduce or alleviate symptoms. In some cases, arthritis from injury can cause chondrocalcinosis.
Other causes of chondrocalcinosis include:
Hypercalcaemia, especially when caused by hyperparathyroidism
Arthritis
Pseudogout
Wilson disease
Hemochromatosis
Ochronosis
Hypophosphatasia
Hypothyroidism
Hyperoxalemia
Acromegaly
Gitelman syndrome

Diagnosis
Chondrocalcinosis can be visualized on projectional radiography, CT scan, MRI, US, and nuclear medicine. CT scans and MRIs show calcific masses (usually within the ligamentum flavum or joint capsule), however radiography is more successful. At ultrasound, chondrocalcinosis may be depicted as echogenic foci with no acoustic shadow within the hyaline cartilage. As with most conditions, chondrocalcinosis can present with similarity to other diseases such as ankylosing spondylitis and gout.

References

Radiologic signs